Thomas James MacKeough (October 12, 1922 – January 2, 1990) was a Canadian politician, who represented the electoral district of Cape Breton North in the Nova Scotia House of Assembly from 1960 to 1978. He was a member of the Progressive Conservatives. McKeough served in the Executive Council of Nova Scotia as Minister of Municipal Affairs, Minister of Labour, Minister of Trade and Industry, and Minister of Finance. He played a major role in reshaping EMS in Nova Scotia. Following his retirement from politics, McKeough chaired a Provincial Task Force on Occupation Health and Safety in the workplace.

References

1922 births
1990 deaths
Progressive Conservative Association of Nova Scotia MLAs
People from the Cape Breton Regional Municipality